The Dallara DW12 (formally named the Dallara IR-12) is an open-wheel formula racing car developed and produced by Italian manufacturer Dallara for use in the IndyCar Series. It was developed for use in the 2012 IndyCar Series season, replacing the aging Dallara IR-05 chassis and scheduled to be used until at least the 2024 season. The chassis is named after Dan Wheldon, who was the car's test driver, and who was killed at Las Vegas Motor Speedway on October 16, 2011, the final race of the previous IR-05.

Starting in 2012 the series moved to using a common chassis supplied by Dallara. Using a single supplier to supply chassis was introduced as a cost control method, and IndyCar has negotiated a fixed cost of $349,000 per chassis. The new specification of chassis also improved safety, the most obvious feature being the partial enclosure around the rear wheels.

This chassis is intended to support multiple aerodynamic kits, but the introduction of these was delayed until 2015, with Honda and Chevrolet supplying the alternatives to the Dallara package.

On October 18, 2011, Italian manufacturer Dallara confirmed that the 2012 series car would be named after the late IndyCar driver Dan Wheldon (DW12) in honor of his work testing the car before his death two days prior at Las Vegas. The new front section is designed to prevent similar single-seater crashes such as the one that killed Wheldon.  The nomenclature is similar to that of the old Formula One team Ligier, whose cars were labeled JSxx in memory of French F1 driver Jo Schlesser after his death at the 1968 French Grand Prix.

The ICONIC Project
The 2012 season saw the implementation of the Indy Racing League's new ICONIC Plan (Innovative, Competitive, Open-wheel, New, Industry-relevant, Cost-effective), the biggest change to the sport in recent history. The car used through 2011, a 2003/2007-model Dallara IR-05, and naturally aspirated V8 engines (required since 1997) were permanently retired. The ICONIC committee was composed of experts and executives from racing and technical fields: Randy Bernard (INDYCAR CEO), William R. Looney III (military), Brian Barnhart (INDYCAR), Gil de Ferran (retired Indy 500 champion), Tony Purnell (motorsport), Eddie Gossage (Texas Motor Speedway), Neil Ressler, Tony Cotman (NZR Track Consulting) and Rick Long (motorsport). IndyCar accepted proposals from BAT Engineering, Dallara, DeltaWing, Lola and Swift for chassis design. On July 14, 2010, the final decision was made public, with organisers accepting the Dallara proposal.

New chassis
Under the new ICONIC regulations, all teams will compete with a core rolling chassis, called the "IndyCar Safety Cell", developed by Italian designer Dallara. Teams will then outfit the chassis with separate body work, referred to as "Aero Kits", which consist of front and rear wings, sidepods, and engine cowlings. Development of Aero Kits is open to any manufacturer, with all packages to be made available to all teams for a maximum price. ICONIC committee member Tony Purnell gave an open invitation to car manufacturers and companies such as Lockheed Martin and GE to develop kits.

The IndyCar Safety Cell will be capped at a price of $349,000 and will be assembled at a new Dallara facility in Speedway, Indiana. Aero Kits will be capped at $70,000. Teams have the option of buying a complete Dallara safety cell/aero kit for a discounted price.

On May 12, 2011, Dallara unveiled the first concept cars, one apiece in oval and road course Aero Kit configuration.

On April 30, 2011, IndyCar owners voted 15–0 to reject the introduction of multiple Aero Kits for the 2012 season, citing costs. Owners expressed their desire to introduce the new chassis/engines for 2012, but have all participants use the Dallara aerodynamic package in 2012, and delay the introduction of multiple aero kits until 2013. On August 14, 2011, IndyCar confirmed that the introduction of multiple Aero Kits would be delayed until 2013 for "economic reasons", and furthermore, it was put off for 2013 as well. Chevrolet and Lotus had already announced their intention to build aero kits.

2011 Indianapolis 500 winner Dan Wheldon carried out the first official test of the Dallara chassis at Mid-Ohio in August 2011. Following Wheldon's death at the season-ending race in Las Vegas, Dallara announced that the 2012 chassis would be named the DW12 in his honor.

Mk. I: Original Dallara aero kit (2012–2014)

The first official test of the Dallara IR-12 chassis was carried out by Dan Wheldon at Mid-Ohio on August 8, 2011. Phase I of testing involved Wheldon, and was planned to involve three road courses and three ovals, over a total of about twelve days. The second test was held August 18 at Barber, and the third was held on the USGP road course at Indianapolis on September 1. Oval tests took place in September at Iowa and Indianapolis.

Honda (Scott Dixon) and Chevrolet (Will Power) began Phase II of on-track testing at Mid-Ohio in early October. A scheduled test at Las Vegas was cancelled after Wheldon lost his life in the 2011 race held at the track, resulting in Dallara renaming the chassis, a practice adopted from Ligier, which named its race cars "JS" for Jo Schlesser. Testing resumed in late October and continued through February at several venues including Sebring, Fontana, Homestead, Phoenix, and Sonoma. Lotus first took to the track on January 12 at Palm Beach, and testing by individual teams began on January 16.

A full-field official open test took place on March 5–6 and 8–9, 2012 at Sebring International Raceway.

The Dallara DW12's race début was at the 2012 Honda Grand Prix of St. Petersburg on March 25, 2012. Team Penske's Will Power won the inaugural pole and Hélio Castroneves won the first race with the DW12.

Full-field oval open tests also took place on April 4, 2012, at Indianapolis Motor Speedway and May 7, 2012, at Texas Motor Speedway.

The car's Indianapolis debut came in the 2012 Indianapolis 500.  In its first three 500s the car saw 136 lead changes, including a track-record 68 in 2013.

Mk. II: First facelift - manufacturer aero kits (2015–2017)

Honda and Chevrolet introduced their first facelift aero kits designed by them, in partnership with Wirth Research for Honda, and Pratt & Miller for Chevrolet. It was meant to be implemented in 2012, but was delayed to 2013, before being finally introduced in 2015. In the first season of use the Chevrolet Aerokits proved dominant, with Chevrolet powered teams winning all but six races in the season.  Midway through the season, both manufacturers introduce an update to the aerokit, with the Honda kit losing its front wing endplates on safety grounds, while Chevrolet introduced an additional winglet.

The first official test of Chevrolet's Aero Kit was carried by Will Power on October 17, 2014, at Circuit of the Americas. Dallara DW12 Chevrolet Aero Kit made a pre-season testing debut at NOLA Motorsports Park on March 14, 2015. The Dallara DW12 Chevrolet Aero Kit's race debut was at the 2015 Firestone Grand Prix of St. Petersburg on March 29, 2015. Team Penske's Will Power won the inaugural pole and Juan Pablo Montoya won the first race with the DW12 Chevrolet Aerokit.

In 2016, in response to the flipping incidents of Chevrolet powered teams at the 2015 Indianapolis 500, domed skids were reintroduced to the series. Zylon bodywork tethers were also added to the cars, to prevent loose bodywork from leaving a car, and striking another competitor, following the death of Justin Wilson, who was struck by loose bodywork. In addition, bodywork updates were issued by both manufacturers to their aerokits. Compared to the Chevrolet aero kit, the Honda kit saw numerous changes, with the front wing being altered from a stacked triple element, to a simpler dual element section, with a new endplate section introduced. In addition, new sidepods were introduced on the road course kit, while a new tyre ramp was introduced with it, and vents were added to the rear wing endplates. The Chevrolet Aero Kit was less dominant, compared to the previous season.

For the 2017 season, a developmental freeze was introduced, ahead of the introduction of the new IR18 Universal Aerokits.

Mk. III: Second facelift - Universal Aero Kit (2018–2023)

In March 2017, IndyCar Series announced that the DW12 would receive a redesign and facelift of its aerodynamic system, with all cars to run identical aero kits at all races starting in 2018. Codenamed UAK18 (Universal Aero Kit 2018), the base Dallara safety cell design would remain as-was: however, several components, including the airbox and rear-wheel guards, would be removed. The latter were removed as research showed that they were largely ineffective in reducing large crashes and would often break easily, as would other extraneous winglets. The new kits are designed to ensure that more downforce comes from ground effects than the wings, and the visuals were inspired by classic Indy car designs from the 1980s and 1990s. In addition, teams will save money as they will no longer have to buy different base undertray chassis strictly for superspeedways such as Indianapolis: now, the same chassis can accommodate aero kits for both road/street/short oval courses and the longer ovals.

For the cockpit section, all IndyCar Series entrants began to utilize the all-new Cosworth CCW Mk2 steering wheel and also-new Configurable Display Unit 4.3 display dashes. Due to cost reasons, several smaller IndyCar Series teams (including part-timer and Indianapolis 500-only) still carried over the Pi Research Sigma Wheel digital display for one more season. The driver seats are slightly reprofiled to improve driver comfort as well as modifications such as a slight increase of cockpit length and width to better accommodate driver body height and weight. IndyCar Series was also in talks on the use of cockpit protection for the 2019 season such as aeroscreen to avoid fatal crashes such as that of Justin Wilson in 2015. The aeroscreen was tested by Scott Dixon at ISM Raceway on February 9, 2018 and then by Josef Newgarden at Indianapolis Motor Speedway on April 30, 2018.

The initial new cockpit protection called "Advanced Frontal Protection" made its debut at the 2019 Indianapolis 500, while the new radical cockpit protection will be introduced for 2020 season and the new device will be a combination of aeroscreen and Halo, developed by Red Bull Advanced Technologies.

Mk. IV: Third facelift - Hybrid power and larger engine displacement (2024 onwards)
The IndyCar Series is currently testing updated 2.4 liter V6 powertrains with 100bhp hybrid ERS units provided by German manufacturer Mahle, who has provided such power units to various motorsport categories, such as DTM and in automotive applications. The powertrains are currently in active development after being delayed from the originally scheduled 2023 debut due to the impact of the COVID-19 global pandemic affecting availability of manufacturing capacity for the hybrid power units to allow for manufacturer testing, as well as the desire from IndyCar manufacturer participants Chevrolet and Honda to delay the introduction of the hybrid powertrain to 2024 to allow for more testing, development and security in having the necessary parts to supply participating teams with the new powertrains. As of November 2022, there are currently no plans to introduce a new chassis in the near future, with previous plans to debut a new chassis for the 2024-25 seasons now delayed to an unspecified date in the future due to the impact of the pandemic delaying initial design and development from the delayed January 2021 timeframe, with no immediate word on a replacement for the current IR12.

In December 2022, IndyCar announced that the new engine formula scheduled to debut in 2024 had been delayed indefinitely, with no future timetable.

References

External links
Dallara DW12 Car Specifications
Dallara's Official Website

IndyCar Series
Open wheel racing cars
DW12
American Championship racing cars